True Blue may refer to:

Arts and entertainment

Music 
 True Blue (Tina Brooks album), 1960
 True Blue (Hank Crawford album), 1964
 True Blue (Al Cohn and Dexter Gordon album), 1976
 True Blue (Madonna album), 1986
 "True Blue" (Madonna song), the title track and single off the album
 "True Blue", a 1972 song from the Rod Stewart album Never a Dull Moment
 True Blue – The Very Best of John Williamson, 1995 album
 "True Blue" (John Williamson song), a song from the album
 "True Blue" (Luna Sea song), a 1994 single by Luna Sea
 "Tullycraft – True Blue 7"", a 7" debut single by Tullycraft
 "True Blue", a song by Bright Eyes from the single "Lua"
 "True Blue", a song by Dirty Beaches from the album Badlands
 "True Blue", a song by Zone used as the opening theme of Astro Boy
 True Blue: The Best of Sonic the Hedgehog, a compilation album of songs from the Sonic the Hedgehog franchise
 True Blue, a companion CD issued with Frank Black & the Catholics Box Set, released May 2015
 True Blue, a 2005 CD by Bob Mosley, on Taxim Records

Films
 True Blue (1918 film), an American western film directed by Frank Lloyd
 True Blue (1996 film), a film based on the 1989 Dan Topolski and Patrick Robinson book
 True Blue (2001 film), a crime thriller starring Tom Berenger and Lori Heuring

Other media
 True Blue (novel), a 2009 novel by David Baldacci
 True Blue (TV series), a television drama airing 1989–1990
 True Blue: The Oxford Boat Race Mutiny, a 1989 book by Dan Topolski and Patrick Robinson

Other uses
 True Blue (color), a school color of UCLA
 Coventry blue, a blue-dyed cloth renowned for its permanence
 True blue, the French term pure laine, a politically and culturally charged phrase
 True Blue, a racehorse who finished fourth in the 1839 Grand National
 The True Blue Campus of St. George's University, Grenada
 True Blue, codename for the planning of the funeral of Margaret Thatcher